Gujarat Airways was a private airline headquartered in Vadodara, India that operated from 1995 to 2001. It operated a fleet Beech 1900 aircraft on feeder routes in West and South India.  The company slogan was Wings of Comfort.

Destinations
Andhra Pradesh
Hyderabad – Begumpet Airport
Diu
Diu Airport
Gujarat
Ahmedabad – Sardar Vallabhbhai Patel International Airport
Bhavnagar – Bhavnagar Airport
Bhuj – Bhuj Airport
Jamnagar – Jamnagar Airport
Kandla – Kandla Airport
Keshod – Keshod Airport
Porbandar – Porbandar Airport
Rajkot – Rajkot Airport
Vadodara - Civil Airport Harni, base
Karnataka
Bangalore – HAL Airport
Belgaum - Belgaum Airport
Madhya Pradesh
Indore – Devi Ahilyabai Holkar Airport
Maharashtra
Mumbai – Chhatrapati Shivaji International Airport
Nagpur – Dr. Babasaheb Ambedkar International Airport
Pune – Pune Airport

References

External links
 Gujarat Airways Time-Table in 1996

Defunct airlines of India
Airlines established in 1995
Airlines disestablished in 2001
Companies based in Vadodara
Transport in Vadodara
Indian companies disestablished in 2001
Indian companies established in 1995
1995 establishments in Gujarat
2001 disestablishments in India